Raymond Polin (July 7, 1910, Briançon, Hautes-Alpes – February 8, 2001) was a French philosopher.

He taught at the Paris University (since 1961).

He was the president of the University of Paris from 1976 to 1981.

Literary works
 La création des valeurs, 1944
 La compréhension des valeurs, 1945
 Du laid, du mal, du faux, 1948

1910 births
2001 deaths
People from Briançon
École Normale Supérieure alumni
French male non-fiction writers
20th-century French philosophers
20th-century French male writers
Academic staff of the University of Paris